Whitaker is a surname.

Whitaker may also refer to:

Places 
 Whitaker, Indiana, U.S.
 Whitaker, Kentucky, U.S.
 Whitaker, Pennsylvania, U.S.

Other uses 
 Whitaker's Almanack, a British reference book
 Whitaker Airport, an airport near Oakland, Oregon, U.S.
 Whitaker baronets, a title in the Baronetage of the United Kingdom
 Whitaker Center for Science and the Arts, in Harrisburg, Pennsylvania, U.S.
 Whitaker Foundation, an organization that supports biomedical engineering research and education
 Whitaker and Baxter, an American political consulting firm
 , more than one ship of the Royal Navy
 Whitaker's Field, a property near Ojai, California, U.S

See also 
 
 Whitaker House (disambiguation)
 Whittaker (disambiguation)
 Whitacre (disambiguation)
 Whitaker Bank Ballpark, is a stadium in Lexington, Kentucky.
 William Whitaker's Words, a computer program that parses the inflection or conjugation of a Latin word